Bangor Academy and Sixth Form College (informally Bangor Academy) is an 11–18 co-educational, secondary school and sixth form in Bangor, County Down, Northern Ireland.

As of March 2023, the school is the largest in Northern Ireland with 1,835 pupils enrolled at the school.

History 
The school was formed as part of a merger between the Bangor High for Girls school and Gransha Boys' High school. The name for the newly formed school was Bangor Academy and Sixth Form College. AWJ Hyndman was appointed to be the school's first principal.

The motto of Gransha Boys' High school was Conando Progredimur ("endeavour to be better"). The school was eventually bulldozed and cleared in 2008.

The schools officially merged in 2001, it was decided to locate the Junior year groups, years 8, 9, and 10 at the Gransha Road campus, the Senior year groups, years 11, 12 and Sixth Form were based at the Castle Street campus.

It was announced on 1 March 2001 by the Department of Education for Northern Ireland that a new school campus was to be built to accommodate 1,650 pupils with an investment package totalling £21 million.

All year groups moved into the new school building located on the Castle Park Road in 2008.

In March 2023, the school announced its plans to "transform" into an integrated school. Its current stage is at the parent/guardian ballot, which will take place between 6 May and 6 June 2023.

School emblem 
The Gryphon is the official emblem of the school which was adopted from the Gransha Boys' High school emblem. The old Gransha motto was dropped, however.

Staff 
Staffing comprises 91 teachers and 24 non-teaching staff. With the addition of supervisory, school meals, facilities management and cleaning staff the school employs 160 people.

The pupil to teacher ratios for 2012-2013 was 16:6 calculated by the Department of Education for Northern Ireland.

Status and awards 
The school has been recognised for its work through awards including the status of Specialist School in Humanities by the Department of Education, the International School Award by the British Council and both the Northern Ireland and National Training Awards by the Department of Employment and Learning.

In 2011, it was recognised with the ICT Mark by Naace, the ICT Association, which confirmed the School's development work and achievement in ICT. This award was reconfirmed on the school in May 2014.

The school has been recognised by the Chinese Institute as a hub for their Confucius Classroom promotion.

In January 2014, it was awarded the 3rd Millennium Learning Award from Naace for promoting the role of technology in advancing education, .

Following April 2016, the students and staff had achieved a new Guinness World Record for the most persons doing sit-ups at the same time (827), overtaking the previous record of 503.

Curriculum 
The school offers Key Stage 3, GCSE and A level provision. It is part of both the North Down and Ards Learning Communities and is a member of the Bangor Learning Partnership. Through these relationships additional subjects become available to pupils and are provided depending on need.

There are curriculum links with the South Eastern Regional College (SERC) which is directly across the road from the school.

Building 

The school building was built following a Public Private Partnership scheme and opened in 2008.

Official opening 

Prince Edward, Earl of Wessex officially opened the new building on Thursday 3 December 2009.

Notable alumni

 Alex Easton MLA - Alex was elected to the Northern Ireland Assembly in 2003 for the constituency of North Down and returned again in 2007 and again in 2011 where he topped the poll for North Down.
 George Hamilton - Chief Constable of  PSNI (Police Service of Northern Ireland),  was a former pupil of the Gransha Boys High school, Bangor.
 Josh Magennis - striker for Scottish Premiership club Aberdeen.

References

External links 
 

Secondary schools in County Down
Bangor, County Down
Educational institutions established in 2001
2001 establishments in Northern Ireland
Specialist colleges in Northern Ireland